The Monumento a la Victoria del 5 de Mayo is installed in the city of Puebla, Puebla, Mexico.

References

Horses in art
Monuments and memorials in Puebla
Outdoor sculptures in Puebla (city)
Sculptures of men in Mexico
Statues in Puebla